Kinboshi Ramen is a ramen shop in Portland, Oregon.

Description and history 
Kinboshi Ramen is located on Southeast Ankeny in southeast Portland's Buckman neighborhood. The restaurant was one of two Marukin Ramen outposts in Portland, until 2021 (the second operated at Pine Street Market, which is housed in Old Town Chinatown's United Carriage and Baggage Transfer Building).

Reception 
Seiji Nanbu included Kinboshi in Eater Portland's 2022 overview of "Where to Find Knockout Ramen in Portland and Beyond".

See also

 List of Japanese restaurants

References

External links

 

2021 establishments in Oregon
Buckman, Portland, Oregon
Japanese restaurants in Portland, Oregon
Old Town Chinatown
Ramen shops
Restaurants established in 2021
Southwest Portland, Oregon